Al-Qurain Sporting Club is one of the newer established sporting clubs in Kuwait.

History
After being founded in 2011, they joined the Kuwaiti Handball League the next season.

Achievements and honors

Handball

Domestic

Kuwaiti handball Premier League:0

(runners-up):2
2013–14, 2014–15

Kuwait Handball Federation Cup:0

(runners-up):2
2012–13, 2014–15

international

Arab Handball Championship of Winners' Cup:1 
2014

Asian Club League Handball Championship:0

(third place):1
2014

Boxing

Boxing section was founded in 2012 and the club joined major tournaments in Kuwait and in the GCC.

On November 11, 2015, the club won their inaugural Kuwait Independence Cup and the first club honour.

Achievements

Honours

 Kuwait independence Cup:1
2015

Medals

Total:10

Gold:4
4 (2015)

Silver:5
5 (2015)

Bronze:1
1 (2015)

References

External links
Al-Qurain SC Twitter page 
official website

 
Qurain
Qurain
Qurain
Qurain
Qurain